Rodes Creek is a stream in the U.S. state of Missouri. It is a tributary to Pebble Creek.

Rodes Creek was named after Boyle Rodes (1882-1945), the first mayor of Ladue, Missouri.

References

Rivers of Missouri
Rivers of St. Louis County, Missouri